Gadouan is a town in west-central Ivory Coast. It is a sub-prefecture of Daloa Department in Haut-Sassandra Region, Sassandra-Marahoué District.

Gadouan was a commune until March 2012, when it became one of 1126 communes nationwide that were abolished.

In 2014, the population of the sub-prefecture of Gadouan was 57,470.

Villages
The 7 villages of the sub-prefecture of Gadouan and their population in 2014 are:
 Bébouo-Sibouo (4 084)
 Bidiahouan (4 771)
 Gadouan (12 821)
 Kribléguhé-Kpamizon (2 504)
 Niamayo (2 622)
 Zagoréta (9 801)
 Zaliohouan (20 867)

Notes

Sub-prefectures of Haut-Sassandra
Former communes of Ivory Coast